Jade Garden Restaurant is a Chinese restaurant in Seattle, in the U.S. state of Washington.

Description 
Jade Garden Restaurant serves dim sum; the menu has included steamed pork buns, prawns, and hot and sour soup. For Lunar New Year, the restaurant has served cakes with Chinese sausage, dried shrimp, taro, and dried daikon. Murals have been painted at the restaurant.

History 
The restaurant is owned by Eric Chan. Jade Garden was remodeled . During the COVID-19 pandemic, the restaurant operated via take-out temporarily and was vandalized in 2020.

Reception 
Jenise Silva included Jade Garden in Eater Seattle's 2021 list of "Seattle Area Restaurant Dishes That Make for Great Leftovers". Additionally, Leonardo David Raymundo and Ryan Lee included the business in a list of "14 Delightful Dim Sum Restaurants in the Seattle Area". In 2022, the website's Jade Yamazaki Stewart and Jay Friedman included Jade Garden in a list of "20 Knockout Chinese and Taiwanese Restaurants in the Seattle Area".

See also
 History of Chinese Americans in Seattle
 List of Chinese restaurants

References

External links
 

Chinatown–International District, Seattle
Chinese restaurants in Seattle
Dim sum